"Hi-De-Ho" is a song written, produced, and performed by American rock musician Jack White, featuring rapper and producer Q-Tip, former lead of the hip-hop group A Tribe Called Quest, who is also credited for writing the song. It is issued as the third single from White's fourth studio album Fear of the Dawn. It is based on and samples the scat phrase sung by Cab Calloway in the 1931 song, "Minnie the Moocher".

Background
White was first involved with Q-Tip when he brought him out to perform "That Black Bat Licorice" during a show at Madison Square Garden, then performed "Excursions" by A Tribe Called Quest on January 31, 2015.

The production of "Hi-De-Ho" began when White first heard it on the radio, and enjoyed it so much that he had the idea of sampling Calloway's scatting along with a drumbeat. He later invited Q-Tip to be part of the production.

Promotion and release
It was uploaded on White's YouTube channel and released on digital download and streaming on March 3, 2022. A limited edition 7-inch tri-color single paired with A-side, "Queen of the Bees" is available exclusively at Third Man Records Cass Corridor Detroit on April 9, 2022, to promote White's fifth studio album Entering Heaven Alive, released on July 22, along with his Supply Chain Issues Tour.

Personnel
 Jack White – vocals, drums, synthesizers, percussion, lead electric guitar, lead acoustic guitar
 Q-Tip – vocals, handclaps
 Olivia Jean – acoustic rhythm guitar, electric guitar

References

External links
 

2022 songs
2022 singles
Third Man Records singles
Song recordings produced by Jack White
Songs written by Jack White
Jack White songs
Q-Tip (musician) songs
Songs written by Q-Tip (musician)
Songs written by Jack Palmer (composer)